Façade is an artificial-intelligence-based interactive story created by Michael Mateas and Andrew Stern. It was the winner of the Grand Jury Prize at the 2006 Slamdance Independent Games Festival and has been exhibited at several international art shows. In 2010, it was included as one of the titles in the book 1001 Video Games You Must Play Before You Die.

Overview
Façade puts the player in the role of a close friend of Trip and Grace, a couple who recently invited the player to their New York City apartment for cocktails. This pleasant gathering, however, is somewhat damaged by the clear domestic confrontation between Grace and Trip upon the player's entry. Making full use of the incorporated language processing software, Façade allows the player to type sentences to "speak" with the couple, either supporting them through their troubles, driving them farther apart, or being thrown out of the apartment.

Incorporating elements of both interactivity and drama, Façade takes advantage of voice acting and a 3-D environment, as well as natural language processing and other advanced artificial intelligence routines, to provide a robust interactive fiction experience. The player can take an active role in the conversation, pushing the topic one way or another, as in an interactive stage-play. These stage-plays are stored as script text files which can be read after the player has finished.

Façade was released for Microsoft Windows in July 2005, as a free download from the InteractiveStory.net web site.

, the creators of Façade were developing another title called The Party, however, in December 2013, Michael Mateas confirmed that they were not currently working on it.

Plot events
Most playthroughs end with either Trip and Grace managing an initial reconciliation and telling the player they need to be alone, or being so offended by the player that Trip forcibly removes them from the apartment. However, with active intervention, it is possible to inspire the two to rediscover their love for one another, or to push one to leave the other – sometimes admitting a past affair, one of many events decided at random when play begins.

Because much of it is designed to simulate 'on-the-fly' reactions to the player's or other characters' actions, and because the scenario features a random series of events (such as what conversational topics are brought up, what drinks Trip wants to serve, etc.) it possesses a certain amount of replay value.

The parser through which the player communicates to the actors is also notable for its ability to recognize and accept a large number of complex commands and respond to them adequately. Many questions can be fully parsed by the engine and the actors can respond in a variety of ways dependent on their mood, random fluctuations, and the player's past actions. For example, in one scenario, Grace may respond favorably to the statement 'I love your decorations.', while in another context she may believe you are condescending to her. Although not every statement made by the player will be successfully parsed, often the engine will pull related information and integrate it using the built-in voice acting clips. As such, proper spelling and grammar is almost always required for optimal player experience. The engine does have some quirks, however; for example, saying the word "melon" at any time will result in the player being kicked out immediately.

Music Score
Composer Leo Caruso developed various segments of the incidental music for this game (5 composers were involved in the full production).

Awards and recognition
Façade won the Grand Jury Prize at the 2006 Slamdance Independent Games Festival; an early, incomplete version was a finalist at the 2004 Independent Games Festival. It has been exhibited at several international art shows including ISEA 2004 and Game/Play 2006, and was the subject of a feature article in both The Atlantic Monthly in November 2006 and Games for Windows: The Official Magazine in May 2007.

Reception

Façade has received a mixed reception: as technology and possibility it is widely considered a major advance in interactive drama, while opinions on how enjoyable it is to play are more divided. Some find that when successful, it is very effective drama, while others find the drama to be a weak point. The open-ended narrative, with many possible outcomes, is often compared to Galatea by Emily Short.

See also
 Cybertext
 Expressive Intelligence Studio

Notes

References

External links
 

Freeware
2005 video games
2000s interactive fiction
Art games
Windows games
MacOS games
Video games developed in the United States
Video games featuring protagonists of selectable gender
Video games featuring non-playable protagonists
Video games with alternate endings
Single-player video games
Works about divorce
Video games set in New York City